Wagner's gerbil (Dipodillus dasyurus) is a gerbil that is native mainly to the Nile Delta, Israel, the Sinai, Syria, Iraq and the Arabian Peninsula. It also referred to as the rough-tailed dipodil or Wadi Hof gerbil.  They are solo, burrowing mammals that are nocturnally active.

References

Musser, G. G. and M. D. Carleton. 2005. Superfamily Muroidea. Pp. 894–1531 in Mammal Species of the World a Taxonomic and Geographic Reference. D. E. Wilson and D. M. Reeder eds. Johns Hopkins University Press, Baltimore.

Dipodillus
Gerbil, Wagner's
Gerbil, Wagner's
Mammals described in 1842
Taxobox binomials not recognized by IUCN